Adolf Hellquist (30 August 1901 – 9 December 1971) was a Swedish diver. He competed in two events at the 1924 Summer Olympics.

References

External links
 

1901 births
1971 deaths
Swedish male divers
Olympic divers of Sweden
Divers at the 1924 Summer Olympics
Divers from Stockholm
20th-century Swedish people